Jasmine Turner (born 17 December 1994) is a Maltese footballer who plays as a defender and has appeared for the Malta women's national team.

Career
Turner has been capped for the Malta national team, appearing for the team during the UEFA Women's Euro 2021 qualifying cycle.

References

External links
 
 

1994 births
Living people
Maltese women's footballers
Malta women's international footballers
Women's association football defenders